Kelly Evernden was the defending champion, but lost in the third round this year.

Christian Saceanu won the title, defeating Ramesh Krishnan 6–4, 2–6, 6–2 in the final.

Seeds

  Jonas Svensson (second round)
  Michiel Schapers (third round)
  Ramesh Krishnan (final)
  Magnus Gustafsson (third round)
  Eric Jelen (quarterfinals)
  Kelly Evernden (third round)
  Jeremy Bates (second round)
  Christian Saceanu (champion)
  Tim Wilkison (second round)
  Jérôme Potier (third round)
  Eduardo Masso (quarterfinals)
  Patrik Kühnen (third round)
  Javier Frana (third round)
  Todd Nelson (second round)
  Andrew Castle (second round)
  Martin Davis (third round)

Draw

Finals

Top half

Section 1

Section 2

Bottom half

Section 3

Section 4

External links
 Main Draw

Singles